George Leonard Shield Pattullo (c. 1893/1894 – 13 January 1968) was a Scottish rugby union player who represented Scotland at the 1920 Five Nations Championship.

Born in Colombo, he played the fullback position.

References

1890s births
1968 deaths
Scottish rugby union players
Rugby union fullbacks
Sportspeople from Colombo
Scottish people of Sri Lankan descent
Sri Lankan people of Scottish descent
People from British Ceylon